The 1967 UC Davis Aggies football team represented the University of California, Davis as a member of the Far Western Conference (FWC) during the 1967 NCAA College Division football season. Led by fifth-year head coach Herb Schmalenberger, the Aggies compiled an overall record of 3–6 with a mark of 2–4 in conference play, placing sixth in the FWC. The team was outscored by its opponents 212 to 164 for the season. The Aggies played home games at Toomey Field in Davis, California.

The UC Davis sports teams were commonly called the "Cal Aggies" from 1924 until the mid 1970s.

Schedule

References

UC Davis
UC Davis Aggies football seasons
UC Davis Aggies football